The Avengers: Earth's Mightiest Heroes is an American superhero animated television series by Marvel Animation in cooperation with Film Roman, based on the Marvel Comics superhero team the Avengers. The show debuted on Disney XD and online in the fall of 2010, starting with a 20-part micro-series that were later broadcast as five television episodes. In the second season, it was one of the inaugural shows of the Marvel Universe programming block alongside Ultimate Spider-Man.

The series originally features a team based on the roster for the original Avengers, composed of Iron Man, Giant-Man, Hulk, Thor, and Wasp. The team is later joined by Captain America, Black Panther, and Hawkeye in the first season, and Ms. Marvel and Vision in the second season. In terms of overall tone and style, the series is based principally on the original stories by Stan Lee and Jack Kirby. The series also uses material from all eras of the comic's run as well as other sources, such as the Marvel Cinematic Universe.

The series ended on November 11, 2012, and was replaced by Avengers Assemble.

Synopsis

Season one
Following a mass S.H.I.E.L.D. prison breakout, earth's mightiest heroes unite to form the Avengers, a team comprising Iron Man, Captain America, Thor, the Hulk, Ant-Man, the Wasp, Black Panther, and Hawkeye. The Avengers are forced to battle the world's most dangerous supervillains, including Baron Zemo, the Leader, Kang the Conqueror, and Ultron, as well as the criminal organizations Hydra and A.I.M. It is ultimately revealed that Loki orchestrated the breakout so that the Enchantress could form the Masters of Evil to defeat the Avengers and conquer Earth.

Season two 
Following Loki's defeat, the Avengers track down the remnants of the Masters of Evil. The team is joined by Ms. Marvel and the Vision as they face new enemies including Doctor Doom, Thunderbolt Ross, and the Red Skull, as well as alien threats such as the Skrulls, the Kree, and Galactus. The season alludes to a developing storyline in which Surtur, now free of his imprisonment in Muspelheim, slowly gathers his strength to oppose the Avengers as a prelude to Ragnarök.

Numerous other Marvel Comics characters make guest appearances, such as Spider-Man, Wolverine, Scott Lang (the second Ant-Man) and his daughter Cassandra, the Heroes for Hire, Crossfire, the Guardians of the Galaxy, Quake, Beta Ray Bill, the Falcon, and the Winter Soldier.

Episode list

Cast

Principal cast
 Brian Bloom – Steve Rogers / Captain America
 Chris Cox – Clint Barton / Hawkeye, Anton Vanko / Crimson Dynamo, Fandral, Gustav Krueger / Rattler
 Jennifer Hale – Carol Danvers / Ms. Marvel, Corina Korvac
 Peter Jessop – Vision
 Phil LaMarr – J.A.R.V.I.S., Simon Williams / Wonder Man
 Eric Loomis – Tony Stark / Iron Man
 James C. Mathis III – T'Challa / Black Panther, Bulldozer, Cobra
 Colleen O'Shaughnessey – Janet Van Dyne / Wasp, Cassandra Lang, Vapor
 Fred Tatasciore – Bruce Banner / Hulk, Franklin Hall / Graviton, Johnny Horton / Griffin, Kalum Lo, Jerome Beechman / Mandrill, Thaddeus "Thunderbolt" Ross / Red Hulk, Ben Grimm / Thing, Volstagg, Yon-Rogg
 Rick D. Wasserman – Thor, Carl "Crusher" Creel / Absorbing Man, Surtur
 Wally Wingert – Hank Pym / Ant-Man / Giant-Man / Yellowjacket, M.O.D.O.K.

Crew
 Joshua Fine – Supervising Producer
 Vinton Heuck – Director
 Sebastian Montes – Director
 Jamie Simone – Casting and Voice Director
 Christopher Yost – Story Editor, Writer

Production

Development
Josh Fine and a number of other creators of The Avengers: Earth's Mightiest Heroes were initially developing a series based on the Hulk. However, it never made it past the scripting stages before the team was brought on to create a new series based on the Avengers.

Production
Marvel announced in October 2008 that its Marvel Animation division and the outside studio Film Roman would produce an Avengers animated TV series, The Avengers: Earth's Mightiest Heroes, for planned broadcast in 2010. Fifty-two episodes have been confirmed as being in production. The show's executive producers include Simon Philips and Eric S. Rollman. Joshua Fine serves as supervising producer and Christopher Yost serves as story editor on the show. A 20-part micro-series debuted on September 22, 2010, on Disney XD, focusing on each hero's backstory and the events that lead to the main series. The idea behind the micro-episodes came after the success of Star Wars: The Clone Wars. The series started airing on Marvel's sister network, Disney XD in the United States on October 20, 2010, and on Teletoon in Canada on October 22, 2010, in English and March 2011 in French. According to Jeph Loeb, season 2 would presumably begin around October 2011, same as season 1 and producer Josh Fine tweeted in April 2011 that 13 episodes have been completed. Ciro Nieli, one of the show's developers, also had a hand in creating Super Robot Monkey Team Hyperforce Go!.

At the 2011 New York Comic-Con, Marvel TV director, Jeph Loeb contradicted his earlier statement of season 2 launch in late 2011. Loeb announced at the panel at New York Comic-con that "Avengers Season 2 will be coming in early 2012 (to coincide with Ultimate Spider-Man)." This date would later get clarified to April 1, 2012. Dong Woo Animation, Lotto Animation and Noxxon Enterprise has contributed some of the animation for this series.

Cancellation
The Avengers: Earth's Mightiest Heroes was not renewed for a third season and was succeeded by a new Avengers show called Avengers Assemble in 2013. On Saturday, July 14, 2012, at the 2012 Marvel Television Presents panel at San Diego Comic-Con, Jeph Loeb, Head of Marvel Television, said of the relationship between the two shows:

The only voice actors to reprise their roles for Avengers Assemble are Fred Tatasciore and James Matthis III as the Hulk and Black Panther, respectively. Additionally, Drake Bell returned to voice Spider-Man for guest appearances, while the other members of the team share their voices with their counterparts in the separate Ultimate Spider-Man series.

Season 3 Plans
With an executive shift in direction for the latter half of the second season, the producers were given new orders over what direction the series was going to take. Red Skull's story was originally planned to span across Season Three and a possible Season Four before being compressed into the second season's latter half. Other plans for Season Three included the continuation of the Ragnarok story focusing on Thor and a story inspired by Avengers vs. X-Men.

Character designer Thomas Perkins did a series of concept art illustrations in 2012 of what a third season could have looked like. Characters appearing in the art included the New Avengers, Impossible Man, Mockingbird, Human Fly, Rom the Spaceknight, Cyclops, Jean Grey and Daimon Hellstrom.

In September 2020, Christopher Yost revealed his plans for each episode for the cancelled Season Three that included characters that never made it into the show including Doctor Strange, Scarlet Witch, Quicksilver and Magneto. Josh Fine commented that this while he was very entertained by the synopsis he read, they were not discussed by the original writing team. 

After the abrupt cancellation leaving the producers unhappy, and while accepting that it would still be unlikely, Chris Yost and Josh Fine have since discussed their renewed interest in continuing the series.

Release

Comic book
The Avengers: Earth's Mightiest Heroes comic book series, written by Christopher Yost, and artwork by Scott Wegener, Christopher Jones and Patrick Scherberger was published to accompany the series. It was a four-issue limited series. An ongoing comic book series titled The Avengers: Earth's Mightiest Heroes Adventures debuted in April 2012, alongside the Ultimate Spider-Man Adventures series. Christopher Yost returned as the main writer, with Adam Dekraker serving as the comic's creative team, while Nuno Plati provided artwork.

Home media

References

External links
 
 
 

 
2010s American animated television series
2010s American science fiction television series
2010 American television series debuts
2013 American television series endings
Disney XD original programming
Television shows based on Marvel Comics
Marvel Animation
Television series created by Ciro Nieli
Animated television series based on Marvel Comics
American children's animated action television series
American children's animated adventure television series
American children's animated science fantasy television series
American children's animated superhero television series
English-language television shows
Television series about alien visitations
Television series by Disney–ABC Domestic Television
Television series by Film Roman
Works by Christopher Yost